The 1962 Tulane Green Wave football team was an American football team that represented Tulane University during the 1962 NCAA University Division football season as a member of the Southeastern Conference. In their first year under head coach Tommy O'Boyle, the team compiled an 0–10 record.

Schedule

References

Tulane
Tulane Green Wave football seasons
College football winless seasons
Tulane Green Wave football